Sant'Elpidio (Italian for Saint Elpidius) may refer to a pair of Italian municipalities in the Province of Fermo, Marche:

Sant'Elpidio a Mare
Porto Sant'Elpidio

See also

 Elpidius (disambiguation) and Elpidio (disambiguation)